Bearden High School may refer to:

 Bearden High School (Arkansas) - Bearden, Arkansas
 Bearden High School (Tennessee) - Knoxville, Tennessee